David Hamed (born 2 August 1974 in Marseille) is a French former professional  footballer. He last played in the Championnat National as a defender for Amiens SC. He also holds Algerian citizenship.

Hamed played at the professional level in Ligue 1 for Troyes AC, FC Istres and CS Sedan Ardennes and in Ligue 2 for FC Istres, Amiens SC, Troyes AC and FC Istres. With Troyes AC, he played 4 games in the 2001–02 UEFA Cup, scoring one goal. Troyes qualified by being one of the winners of the 2001 UEFA Intertoto Cup.

Honours
Troyes AC
UEFA Intertoto Cup: 2001

References

1974 births
Living people
French footballers
Ligue 1 players
Ligue 2 players
FC Istres players
Amiens SC players
ES Troyes AC players
CS Sedan Ardennes players
Association football defenders